Pedro Filipe Teodósio Mendes (born 1 October 1990) is a Portuguese professional footballer who plays as a central defender for Ligue 1 club Montpellier.

Club career

Sporting CP
Born in Neuchâtel, Switzerland, to Portuguese parents, Mendes reached Sporting CP's youth system in 2005, aged nearly 15. In his first two senior seasons he played with Real SC (third division) and Servette FC (Swiss Challenge League), in both cases on loan, helping the latter club to promotion.

In the summer of 2011, still owned by Sporting, Mendes joined Real Madrid, being assigned to the B team. He made his debut with the main squad on 7 December, coming on as a substitute for Álvaro Arbeloa midway through the second half of a 3–0 away win against AFC Ajax in the group stage of the UEFA Champions League; during his spell at the Santiago Bernabéu Stadium, several of his Castilla teammates expressed their dissatisfaction over what they saw as a preferential treatment by first-team manager José Mourinho, the player's compatriot.

Mendes played his first match in the Primeira Liga with Sporting on 27 January 2013, when he replaced the injured Khalid Boulahrouz at half-time of the 1–1 home draw with Vitória de Guimarães.

Parma
Returning to Sporting for the 2012–13 campaign, Mendes was made captain of the reserves who competed in the Segunda Liga, also appearing sporadically for the main squad. On 28 May 2013, he signed a five-year contract with Parma F.C. in Serie A as a free agent.

On 21 January 2014, Mendes moved to fellow league club U.S. Sassuolo Calcio in a co-ownership deal with Parma. In June he was bought by the latter, who sold Raman Chibsah and Nicola Sansone to the former on the same day.

Rennes
Mendes joined Stade Rennais F.C. of France on 6 July 2015, after agreeing to a four-year contract. He made his debut in Ligue 1 on 8 August, in a 2–1 away loss to SC Bastia.

Montpellier
On 18 July 2017, Mendes signed with Montpellier HSC of the same league. He first appeared for them on 5 August, playing the entire 1–0 home victory over Stade Malherbe Caen, and scored his first goal on 16 September by heading from the corner kick as the visitors defeated ES Troyes AC by the same score.

Mendes became a key part of Michel Der Zakarian's resolute Montpellier side over the following seasons, partnering veterans Daniel Congré and Hilton in a three-man central defence. In October 2018, he extended his contract for two more years up to 2023.

International career
Mendes won exactly 50 caps for Portugal at youth level, including 13 for the under-21 team for whom he scored in a 1–1 home draw against Poland for the 2013 UEFA European Championship qualifiers. His maiden full appearance occurred on 14 October 2018, when he replaced S.L. Benfica's Rúben Dias in the 56th minute of the 3–1 friendly win over Scotland at Hampden Park.

Career statistics

Club

Honours
Real Madrid Castilla
Segunda División B: 2011–12

References

External links

1990 births
Living people
Swiss people of Portuguese descent
Citizens of Portugal through descent
Portuguese footballers
Association football defenders
Primeira Liga players
Liga Portugal 2 players
Segunda Divisão players
Sporting CP footballers
Real S.C. players
Sporting CP B players
Swiss Challenge League players
Servette FC players
Segunda División B players
Real Madrid Castilla footballers
Real Madrid CF players
Serie A players
Parma Calcio 1913 players
U.S. Sassuolo Calcio players
Ligue 1 players
Stade Rennais F.C. players
Montpellier HSC players
Portugal youth international footballers
Portugal under-21 international footballers
Portugal international footballers
Portuguese expatriate footballers
Expatriate footballers in Spain
Expatriate footballers in Italy
Expatriate footballers in France
Portuguese expatriate sportspeople in Spain
Portuguese expatriate sportspeople in Italy
Portuguese expatriate sportspeople in France